Chris Viljoen (born 28 July 1947) is a South African cricketer. He played in five first-class matches for Boland in 1980/81 and 1981/82.

See also
 List of Boland representative cricketers

References

External links
 

1947 births
Living people
South African cricketers
Boland cricketers
Cricketers from Durban